The Gate of Dawn, or Sharp Gate is a city gate in Vilnius, the capital of Lithuania, and one of its most important religious, historical and cultural monuments. It is a major site of Catholic pilgrimage in Lithuania.

History 
It was built between 1503 and 1522 as a part of defensive fortifications for the city of Vilnius, the capital of the Grand Duchy of Lithuania. It has also been known as the Medininkai Gate, as it led to the village Medininkai south of Vilnius, as well as Aštra broma. Of ten city gates, only the Gate of Dawn remains, while the others were destroyed by the order of the government at the end of the 18th century.

Our Lady of the Gate of Dawn 

In the 16th century city gates often contained religious artifacts intended to guard the city from attacks and to bless travelers. The Chapel in the Gate of Dawn contains an icon of The Blessed Virgin Mary, Mother of Mercy, said to have miraculous powers. For centuries the picture has been one of the symbols of the city and an object of veneration for Roman Catholic, Greek Catholic and Eastern Orthodox inhabitants. Thousands of votive offerings adorn the walls and many pilgrims from neighboring countries come to pray in front of the beloved painting.  Masses are held in Lithuanian and Polish languages.

Historical study of the Gate of Dawn in Vilnius recalls the story of Oboźny of the Grand Duchy of Lithuania  Antoni Nowosielski  as the defender of the Gate of Dawn and the commander of the troops of the Grand Duchy of Lithuania during the expansion of the Swedish state and the attack on the city by the Swedish army during the Great Northern War. The Battle of Vilnius took place on 16 April 1702 prince Antoni Nowosielski commanded the forces of the Grand Duchy and defended the fortification with a chapel and a painting icon located in the Gate of Dawn complex. Many Swedish soldiers died in this battle, and none of the Polish and Lithuanians was injured.
However, during the battle the Swedish bullet hit the picture itself. Then, the defender of the Vilnius castle prince Antoni Nowosielski, offered a silver votive. As a sign of gratitude for the victory, prince Antoni Nowosielski hung a silver plaque with the image and appropriate inscription next to the painting. Eventually, after this event, the cult of the holy image and the Gate of Dawn was popularized by the faithful, and the place itself became a national symbol.

After World War II the cult of Our Lady of the Gate of Dawn prevailed in Lithuanian and Polish communities worldwide and is continued in many shrines to the Virgin Mary in Europe, and the Americas. The largest of the churches devoted to Our Lady of the Gate of Dawn is St. Mary's Church in Gdańsk, Poland.

The shrine is also important in the development of the devotion Divine Mercy as it is the first place where the Divine Mercy image was exposed and also where the first celebration of the Divine Mercy Sunday took place.

On 4 September 1993 Pope John Paul II prayed the rosary at the Gate of Dawn Chapel. Church festival of the Blessed Virgin, Mary Mother of Mercy,—celebrated in the third week of November—is of great importance in the Vilnius Archdiocese.

Lithuanian Chapel in the St. Peter's Basilica in Vatican City 
There is a Vilnius' Gate of Dawn Mother of Mercy Chapel in the St. Peter's Basilica in Vatican City. It was consecrated by the Pope Paul VI in 1970 and it is a place where Pope John Paul II had his first prayer after being elected as the Pope in 1978. Only Lithuania, Poland, Hungary and Ireland have such chapels in the St. Peter's Basilica.

Legacy 
 The landmark is mentioned in a poem of Maksim Bahdanovich Pahonia (1913) and its emblem Pahonia, as well as in Adam Mickiewicz's Pan Tadeusz.

Gallery

References

External links 
 
 Catholic Church in Lithuania | Aušros Vartai
  The Congregation of the Sisters of Merciful Jesus 

1522 establishments in Europe
Infrastructure completed in 1522
Gates
Buildings and structures in Vilnius
Renaissance architecture in Lithuania
Neoclassical architecture in Lithuania
Shrines to the Virgin Mary
Roman Catholic shrines in Lithuania
Votive offering
Tourist attractions in Vilnius
Divine Mercy
Objects listed in Lithuanian Registry of Cultural Property